The 67th Filipino Academy of Movie Arts and Sciences (FAMAS) Awards was an awarding ceremony given by the Filipino Academy of Movie Arts and Sciences (FAMAS), an organization composed of prize-winning writers and movie columnists, giving recognition to the Philippine mainstream and independent films, actors, actresses, directors and production staffs for their achievements in the year 2018.

The awards night was held at the Meralco Theater, Pasig, Metro Manila on Sunday, April 28, 2019.

The film Gusto Kita With All My Hypothalamus garnered the most wins with three including Best Picture and Best Director. Nadine Lustre took home the Best Actress award for the film Never Not Love You, while Eddie Garcia and Victor Neri shared the Best Actor trophy for their respective films: ML and A Short History Of A Few Bad Things.

Awards

Major Awards
Winners are listed first and highlighted with boldface.

Special Awards

Comedy King Dolphy Memorial Award
 Maricel Soriano

FAMAS Lifetime Achievement Award
 Marilou Diaz-Abaya
 Laurice Guillen
 Charo Santos-Concio

Fernando Poe, Jr. Award
 Anne Curtis

German Moreno Youth Achievement Award
 Maymay Entrata
 Bianca Umali

References

External links
FAMAS Awards 

FAMAS Award
FAM
FAM